Citrobacter pasteurii  is a bacterium from the genus Citrobacter which has been isolated from human feces in Kentucky in the United States.

References

 

Bacteria described in 2015
pasteurii